Night Peacock is a 2016 romantic drama film directed by Dai Sijie. The film is a Chinese-French co-production. It stars Liu Yifei, Liu Ye, Yu Shaoqun and Leon Lai. The film was released in mainland China by SMG Pictures and Beijing Lupiaoda Media on 20 May 2016.

Plot
The film is set in Chengdu, China and in France.

Cast
Liu Yifei
Liu Ye
Yu Shaoqun
Leon Lai

Production
The film was shot in Paris, France, and in Chengdu, China.

Reception
The film has grossed  at the Chinese box office.

Critical
The film was awarded first prize under the Special Chinese Film category at the 40th Montreal World Film Festival, and Liu was nominated as Best Actress. It also won the Golden Angel Award for Film at the 12th Chinese American Film Festival.

References

External links

2016 films
2016 romantic drama films
Chinese romantic drama films
Films directed by Dai Sijie
Films set in Chengdu
Films set in France
Films shot in Paris
Films shot in Sichuan
French romantic drama films
2010s French films